Events from the year 1959 in the United States. With the admittance of Alaska and Hawaii, this is the last year in which states are added to the union.

Incumbents

Federal Government 
 President: Dwight D. Eisenhower (R-Kansas/Pennsylvania)
 Vice President: Richard Nixon (R-California)
 Chief Justice: Earl Warren (California)
 Speaker of the House of Representatives: Sam Rayburn (D-Texas)
 Senate Majority Leader: Lyndon B. Johnson (D-Texas)
 Congress: 85th (until January 3), 86th (starting January 3)

Events

January–March

 January 2 – CBS Radio cuts four soap operas: Backstage Wife, Our Gal Sunday, The Road of Life and This is Nora Drake.
 January 3 – Alaska is admitted as the 49th U.S. state (see History of Alaska).
 January 7 – The United States recognizes the new Cuban government of Fidel Castro.
 January 22 – Knox Mine Disaster: Water breaches the River Slope Mine near Pittston City in Port Griffith, Pennsylvania; 12 miners are killed.
 January 25 – American Airlines begins the first domestic jet service with a Boeing 707 flight between New York and Los Angeles. 
 January 29 – Walt Disney releases his 16th animated film, Sleeping Beauty, in Beverly Hills. It is the final fairy tale adaptation released by Disney during his lifetime and the last the studio will produce until 1989's The Little Mermaid; also Disney's first animated film to be shown in 70mm and modern 6-track stereophonic sound. Also on the program is Disney's new "pictorial interpretation" Grand Canyon, which uses the music of Ferde Grofé's Grand Canyon Suite. Grand Canyon wins an Academy Award for Best Documentary (Short Subject).
 February 3
 A chartered plane transporting musicians Buddy Holly, Ritchie Valens and The Big Bopper crashes in foggy conditions near Clear Lake, Iowa, killing all four occupants on board, including pilot Roger Peterson. The tragedy is later termed "The Day the Music Died", popularized in Don McLean's 1971 song "American Pie". Future country star Waylon Jennings was scheduled to be on the plane, but gave up his seat to The Big Bopper.
 American Airlines Flight 320, a Lockheed L-188 Electra from Chicago crashes into the East River on approach to New York City's LaGuardia Airport, killing 65 of the 73 people on board.
 February 6 – At Cape Canaveral, Florida, the first successful test firing of a Titan intercontinental ballistic missile is accomplished.
 February 13 – TAT-2, AT&T's second transatlantic telephone cable, goes into operation.
 February 17 – The Vanguard II weather satellite is launched to measure cloud cover for the United States Navy.
 February 22 – Lee Petty wins the first Daytona 500.
 March 3 – Lunar probe Pioneer 4 becomes the first American object to escape dominance by Earth's gravity.
 March 11 – A Raisin in the Sun by Lorraine Hansberry opens on Broadway in New York City.
 March 18 – U.S. President Dwight D. Eisenhower signs a bill allowing for Hawaiian statehood.
 March 31 – The first Busch Gardens amusement park, in Tampa, Florida, is dedicated and opens its gates.

April–June

 April 6 – The 31st Academy Awards ceremony, hosted by Jerry Lewis, Mort Sahl, Tony Randall, Bob Hope, David Niven and Laurence Olivier, is held at Pantages Theatre in Hollywood. Vincente Minnelli's Gigi wins a record nine awards, including Best Motion Picture and Best Director for Minnelli. The film's clean sweep of all nine of its nominations will not be tied again until 1988, and will not be broken until 2004. Gigi is also equalled in nominations by Stanley Kramer's The Defiant Ones.
 April 9 – NASA announces its selection of the "Mercury Seven", seven military pilots to become the first U.S. astronauts.
 April 25 – The Saint Lawrence Seaway linking the North American Great Lakes and the Atlantic Ocean officially opens to shipping.
 May 8 – The first Little Caesars pizza restaurant is opened by Mike Ilitch and his wife Marian in Garden City, Michigan. 
 May 21 – Gypsy: A Musical Fable, starring Ethel Merman in her last new musical, opens on Broadway and runs for 702 performances.
 May 28 – Jupiter AM-18 rocket launches two primates, Miss Baker and Miss Able, into space from Cape Canaveral along with living microorganisms and plant seeds. Successful recovery makes them the first living beings to return safely to Earth after space flight.
 June 8 –  and the United States Postal Service attempt the delivery of mail via Missile Mail.
 June 9 – The USS George Washington is launched at Groton, Connecticut, as the first submarine to carry ballistic missiles (December 30 – commissioned)
 June 23 – Convicted Manhattan Project spy Klaus Fuchs is released after nine years in a British prison and allowed to emigrate to Dresden, East Germany (where he resumes a scientific career).
 June 25 – A KH-1 Corona satellite, believed to be the first operational spy satellite, is launched as science mission 'Discoverer 4' from Vandenberg Air Force Base, California, aboard a Thor-Agena rocket.
 June 26 
 Queen Elizabeth II (as monarch of Canada) and U.S. President Dwight Eisenhower open the Saint Lawrence Seaway.
 Darby O'Gill and the Little People, a film based on Herminie T. Kavanagh's short stories, is released in the U.S. by Walt Disney, two days after its world premiere in Ireland.

July–September

 July 8 – Charles Ovnand and Dale R. Buis become the first Americans killed in action in Vietnam.
 July 15 – Steel strike of 1959: Labor union strike in the U.S. steel industry.
 July 21 – Grove Press, Inc. v. Christenberry decided, affirming that copies of Lady Chatterley's Lover may be distributed in the U.S. under the First Amendment.
 July 24  
 At the opening of the American National Exhibition in Moscow, U.S. Vice President Richard Nixon and USSR Premier Nikita Khrushchev have a "kitchen debate."
 With the admission of Alaska as the 49th U.S. state earlier in the year, the 49-star flag of the United States debuts in Philadelphia, Pennsylvania.
 August 7 
 Explorers program: Launch of Explorer 6 satellite from the Atlantic Missile Range in Cape Canaveral, Florida.
 The Roseburg blast in Oregon, caused when a truck carrying explosives catches fire, kills 14 and causes $12 million worth of damage.
 August 17
 The 1959 Hebgen Lake earthquake in southwest Montana kills 28.
 Miles Davis' influential jazz album Kind of Blue is released.
 August 21 – Hawaii is admitted as the 50th and last U.S. state (see History of Hawaii).
 August 28–September 7 – The 1959 Pan American Games are held in Chicago.
 September 15–28 – Premier of the Soviet Union Nikita Khrushchev and his wife tour the U.S. at the invitation of President Eisenhower.
 September 16 – The Xerox 914, the first plain paper copier, is introduced to the public.
 September 17 – The hypersonic North American X-15 research aircraft, piloted by Scott Crossfield, makes its first powered flight at Edwards Air Force Base, California.

October–December

 October 2 – Rod Serling's classic anthology series The Twilight Zone premieres on CBS.
 October 8 - The Los Angeles Dodgers defeat the Chicago White Sox, 4 games to 2, to win their 2nd World Series Title in baseball.
 October 13 – Launch of Explorer 7 satellite.
 October 21 – The Solomon R. Guggenheim Museum of modern art (designed by Frank Lloyd Wright, who died April 9) opens to the public in New York City.
 November 15 – The brutal Clutter family murders are committed in Holcomb, Kansas.
 November 18 – MGM's widescreen, multimillion-dollar, Technicolor version of Ben-Hur, starring Charlton Heston, is released and becomes the studio's greatest hit up to this time. It is critically acclaimed and eventually wins 11 Academy Awards – a record held until 1998 (when 1997's Titanic becomes the first film to equal it).
 November 25 – Nick Van Til and Ernie Strack open the first Strack & Van Til grocery store in Highland, Lake County, Indiana.
 November – The MOSFET (metal–oxide–semiconductor field-effect transistor), also known as the MOS transistor, is invented by Mohamed Atalla and Dawon Kahng at Bell Labs. It revolutionizes the electronics industry, becomes the fundamental building block of the Digital Revolution and goes on to become the most widely manufactured device in history.
 December 1 – Cold War: Antarctic Treaty – 12 countries, including the United States and the Soviet Union, sign a landmark treaty, which sets aside Antarctica as a scientific preserve and bans military activity on that continent (the first arms control agreement established during the Cold War).
 December 13 – Three years after its first telecast, MGM's The Wizard of Oz (1939 film) is shown on television for the second time, but gains a larger viewing audience than its first television outing, spurring CBS to make it an annual tradition.

Undated

 Car tailfin design reaches its apex with such as the Cadillac Eldorado, Chevrolet Impala second generation model, Dodge Silver Challenger and Imperial Crown Sedan.
 The Henney Kilowatt goes on sale in the U.S., becoming the first production electric car in almost three decades, but only 47 models will be sold in its 2-year production run.
 Pantyhose (nylon or sheer tights) are first sold on the open market as 'Panti-Legs' by Glen Raven Knitting Mills.
 First femur of Arlington Springs Man is found on Santa Rosa Island, California, by Phil C. Orr. The remains are subsequently dated to 13,000 years BP, making them potentially the oldest known human remains in North America.

Ongoing
 Cold War (1947–1991)
 Space Race (1957–1975)

Births

 January 1 – Andy Andrews, American tennis player
 January 2 – Joe Bevilacqua, radio producer and dramatist
 January 5 – Clancy Brown, actor and voice actor
 January 8 – Keith Rodden, NASCAR crew chief
 January 9
 Mark Martin, race car driver and coach
 Otis Nixon, baseball player
 January 10 – Larry McReynolds, auto racing commentator
 January 27 – Keith Olbermann, television sports and political commentator
 January 28 – Megan McDonald, children's author
 January 29 – Michael Sloane, actor, director and screenwriter
 February 4 
 Pamelyn Ferdin, actress and activist 
 Lawrence Taylor, American football player and sportscaster
 February 14 – Renée Fleming, soprano
 February 18 – James Metzger, businessman and philanthropist
 February 19 – Roger Goodell, businessman and football administrator
 February 22 – Kyle MacLachlan, actor
 March 6 – Lars Larson, conservative talk show host
 March 8
Lester Holt, journalist and news anchor
Kato Kaelin, witness in the O. J. Simpson murder case
 March 17 – Christian Clemenson, actor
 March 18 – Irene Cara, singer-songwriter and film actress (d. 2022)
 March 22 – Matthew Modine, actor
 March 31 – Arun Raha, executive director and chief economist for Washington state
 April 3 – David Hyde Pierce, actor
 April 15 – Thomas F. Wilson, actor, writer, musician, painter, voice-over artist, stand-up comedian and podcaster
 April 18 – Susan Faludi, feminist
 April 25 – Tony Phillips, baseball player (d. 2016)
 May 5 – Brian Williams, television journalist
 May 8 – Ronnie Lott, American football player and sportscaster
 May 12
 Dave Christian, ice hockey player
 Ray Gillen, rock singer-songwriter (d. 1993)
 Ving Rhames, African-American actor
 May 17 – Jim Nantz, sportscaster
 May 19 
 Nicole Brown Simpson, second wife of O. J. Simpson and murder victim (d. 1994)
 Jim Ward, voice actor
 May 21 – Loretta Lynch, 83rd U.S. Attorney General from 2015 to 2017.
 May 26 – Kevin Gage, actor
 May 25 – Jim Ardis, corporate executive and politician
 June 3 
John Carlson, radio host
Sam Mills, American football player
 June 6 – Paul Germain, television screenwriter and producer
 June 7 – Mike Pence, 50th Governor of Indiana from 2013 to 2017 & 48th Vice President of the United States from 2017 to 2021
 June 8 – C.T. Fletcher, powerlifter and bodybuilder
 June 9 – Miles O'Brien, television news anchor, pilot
 June 10 – Eliot Spitzer, Governor of New York from 2007 to 2008
 June 11 – Magnum T. A. (Terry Allen), wrestler
 June 11 – Stephen Sweeney, politician
 June 14 – Marcus Miller, African American jazz musician
 June 27 – Jeff Miller, politician
 July 1 – Dale Midkiff, actor
 July 6 – Glenn Kessler, journalist
 July 7 
Ben Linder, engineer (d. 1987)
Mike Pence, 48th Vice President of the United States
 July 9 – Kevin Nash, pro wrestler
 July 12 – Rolonda Watts, actress, producer, voiceover artist, novelist, motivational speaker, and television and radio talk show host
 July 14 – Susana Martinez, Governor of New Mexico from 2011 to 2019
 July 16 – Bob Joles, voice actor and musician
 July 21 – Terry Long, football player (d. 2005)
 July 23 – Carl Phillips, poet
 July 26 – Kevin Spacey, actor and director
 July 31 – Scott Pilarz, Jesuit priest and academic (d. 2021)
 August 10 – Rosanna Arquette, actress
 August 13 – Danny Bonaduce, actor
 August 14
 Marcia Gay Harden, actress
 Magic Johnson, African American basketball player
 August 15 – Scott Altman, astronaut
 August 17
 Jonathan Franzen, novelist
 David Koresh, spiritual leader of the Branch Davidian religious cult (d. 1993)
 Brad Wellman, baseball player
 August 19 – Anthony Sowell, serial killer (d. 2021)
 August 21 – Jim McMahon, American football player
 August 26 – Stan Van Gundy, basketball coach
 August 29 – Timothy Shriver, disability rights activist, film producer, educator and Chairman of Special Olympics
 September 1
 Keith Clearwater, golfer
 Kenny Mayne, American football player and journalist
 Joe Jusko, illustrator and painter
 September 10 – Michael Earl, American puppeteer (died 2015) 
 September 11 – Robert Wrenn, golfer and sportscaster
 September 12 – Scott Brown, U.S. Senator from Massachusetts from 2010 to 2013
 September 13 – Chris Hansen, journalist
 September 14 – Haviland Morris, actress 
 September 15 
 Mark Kirk, U.S. Senator from Illinois from 2010 to 2017
 Mike Reiss,  television comedy writer
 September 18 – Ryne Sandberg, baseball player 
 September 21 – Dave Coulier, actor and comedian 
 September 22 – Saul Perlmutter, astrophysicist, recipient of the Nobel Prize in Physics in 2011
 September 23 – Jason Alexander, actor
 September 28
 Steve Hytner, actor 
 Laura Bruce, artist  
 October 1 – Brian P. Cleary, humorist, author and poet
 October 3
 Fred Couples, golfer
 Greg Proops, comedian
 Jack Wagner, actor
 October 5 
 Maya Lin, architect and sculptor, designed the Vietnam Veterans Memorial and Civil Rights Memorial
 Kelly Joe Phelps, singer-songwriter and guitarist (died 2022)
 David Shannon, writer and illustrator
 October 7 – Clayton Weishuhn, football player (died 2022)
 October 8 
 Nick Bakay, actor, producer and screenwriter 
 Brad Byers, entertainer 
 Tim Flakoll, national education expert and politician
 Mike Morgan, baseball player and coach
 October 10 – Maya Lin, designer and artist
 October 13 – Marie Osmond, country pop singer
 October 17 – Richard Roeper, film critic 
 October 23
 Nancy Grace, television host 
 Sam Raimi, film producer, writer and director
 "Weird Al" Yankovic, singer, accordionist and parodist
 October 24
 Mike Brewer, baseball player
 Michelle Lujan Grisham, lawyer and politician
 Dave Meltzer, journalist and historian
 October 25 – Collette Sunderman, voice director
 October 26 – Paul Farmer, anthropologist and physician (died 2022) 
 October 29 – Jesse Barfield, baseball player and sportscaster
 November 19 – Allison Janney, actress
 November 20 
 Raffi Hovannisian, American-born Armenian politician
 James McGovern, lawyer and politician
 Sean Young, actress
 December 2 – David Alward, 32nd Premier of New Brunswick 2010-2014
 December 10 – Mariann Budde, Episcopal Bishop of Washington
 December 21 – Florence Griffith Joyner, African American athlete (d. 1998)
 December 24 – Lee Daniels, African American film director
 December 25 – Michael P. Anderson, astronaut (d. 2003)

 December 31 – Val Kilmer, American actor

Deaths

 January 20 – Carl Switzer, actor, shot to death (born 1927)
 January 21 – Cecil B. DeMille, film director (born 1881)
 February 3 – "The Day the Music Died" plane crash
Big Bopper, disc jockey and singer-songwriter (born 1930)
Buddy Holly, singer-songwriter and a pioneer of rock and roll (born 1936)
Ritchie Valens, Mexican-American singer-songwriter and guitarist (born 1941)
 February 20 – Ray McDonald, dancer, barbiturate overdose (born 1920)
 February 22 – Helen Parrish, film actress, cancer (born 1924)
 March 3 – Lou Costello, actor and comedian, part of Abbott & Costello team (born 1906)
 March 4 – Maxie Long, track athlete (born 1878)
 March 16 – John Sailing, last documented Civil War veteran (age 111)
 April 9 – Frank Lloyd Wright, architect, interior designer, writer and educator (born 1867)
 April 27 – Gordon Armstrong, inventor of the baby incubator
 May 4 – William S. Pye, admiral (born 1880)
 June 2 – Orelia Key Bell, poet (born 1864)
 June 16 – George Reeves, actor, shot to death (born 1914)
 June 18 – Ethel Barrymore, actress (born 1879)
 June 25 – Charles Starkweather, spree killer, judicially executed by electrocution (born 1938)
 July 8 – 1st Americans killed in Vietnam War
Dale R. Buis, military advisor (born 1921)
Chester M. Ovnand, military advisor (born 1914)
 July 17 – Billie Holiday, jazz singer (born 1915) 
 August 16 – William Halsey Jr., U.S. vice-admiral (Pacific War) (born 1882)
 October 7 – Mario Lanza, opera singer, heart attack (born 1921)
 October 14 – Errol Flynn, film actor, heart attack (born 1909 in Australia)
 October 16 – George Marshall, U.S. army general (born 1880)
 November 21 – Max Baer, heavyweight boxing champion (born 1909)

See also
 List of American films of 1959
 Timeline of United States history (1950–1969)

References

External links
 

 
1950s in the United States
United States
United States
Years of the 20th century in the United States